Talking Books is a BBC radio and TV programme hosted by Razia Iqbal. Talking Books is shown by BBC World TV and thel and is a half hour interview programme with writers.

References

BBC Radio programmes